William Carleton may refer to:

 William Carleton (1794–1869), Irish novelist 
 William Carleton (Massachusetts businessman) (1797–1876), American inventor and philanthropist
 William P. Carleton (1872–1947), Anglo-American film actor, sometimes billed as William Carleton Jr.
 William T. Carleton (1859–1930), Anglo-American film and stage actor
 Will Carleton (1845–1912), American poet